Reister is a German surname. Notable people with the surname include:

John Reister (1715–1804), American settler
Julian Reister (born 1986), German tennis player

See also
Reisser

German-language surnames